Free Libyana or Libyana Al Hura is a mobile telephone network in Eastern Libya. It was created during the Libyan Civil War by disconnecting part of the Libyana mobile phone network from its central control in Tripoli and placing it under new control as an independent network.

References

External links
Libyana Al Hura information and status site at lytawasil.com

Communications in Libya
First Libyan Civil War